Dayvon is a male given name. Notable people with the given name include:

Dayvon Bennett (1994–2020), better known as King Von, American rapper
Dayvon Ross (born 1991), American football player

See also
Davon

Masculine given names